Cukierman is a Jewish surname, spelled in the Polish way, parallel to the Yiddish/German Jewish surname Zuckermann. Notable people with the surname include:

 Cécile Cukierman (born 1976), French politician
 Daniel Cukierman (born 1995), Israeli tennis player
 Edouard Cukierman (born 1965), French-Israeli businessman
 Icchak Cukierman, (a.k.a. Yitzhak Zuckerman, 1915–1981), one of the leaders of the Warsaw Ghetto Uprising 1943
 Josef Cukierman, (1899–1940) Jewish Polish-born French chess master
 Roger Cukierman (born 1936), French banker, businessman, and Jewish philanthropist

See also
Zuckermann
Zukerman